Clara Lerby (born 8 May 1999) is a Swedish handball player for Lugi HF and the Swedish national team.

Lerby represented Sweden at the 2017 Women's U-19 European Handball Championship, placing 9th and at the 2018 Women's Junior World Handball Championship, placing 12th.

She also represented Sweden at the 2021 World Women's Handball Championship.

References

1999 births
Living people
Swedish female handball players
People from Trelleborg
Sportspeople from Skåne County
21st-century Swedish women